

Films

1985 in LGBT history
1985